Van Gelderen is a Dutch toponymic surname meaning from/of the city of Geldern or from/of the county/duchy of Guelders. It may refer to:

Charlie van Gelderen (1913–2001), South African labor activist
Gerrit van Gelderen (1926–1994), Dutch naturalist, film-maker, illustrator and cartoonist in Ireland
Henk van Gelderen (1921–2020), Dutch resistance member
Jacob van Gelderen (1891–1940), Dutch economist
Jordi van Gelderen (born 1990), Dutch footballer

See also
Van Gelder, surname of the same origin

References

Dutch-language surnames
Surnames of Dutch origin
Toponymic surnames